Big Ben Donovan is a fictional character appearing in American comic books published by Marvel Comics.

Donovan was portrayed by Danny Johnson in the Marvel Television series Daredevil and Luke Cage, set in the Marvel Cinematic Universe (MCU).

Publication history
Big Ben Donovan first appeared in Luke Cage, Hero for Hire #14 and was created by Steve Engelhart and Billy Graham.

Fictional character biography
Mrs. Jenks hired him to settle the last of Mr. Jenks' affairs. When Mrs. Jenks would be giving Big Ben Donovan the payoff, he drunkly went after Mrs. Jenks who ran to the office of Luke Cage. This led to a fight between Luke Cage and Big Ben Donovan which ended with Big Ben Donovan surrendering upon the misunderstanding being cleared up. Big Ben Donovan agreed to help Luke Cage out in any way.

Big Ben Donovan later witnessed Mrs. Jenks' confession of killing a reporter named Phil Fox (who was actually killed by Billy Bob Rackham). He then informed Luke Cage about Mrs. Jenks' confession before she died.

Big Ben Donovan acted as Claire Temple's lawyer in order to clear her of the murder charge. He then continued working as Luke Cage's lawyer until he started working with Jeryn Hogarth.

Big Ben Donovan had a brother named Paul who just became the leader of the Thunderbolts Gang where they made the mistake of fighting the Maggia for control of their turf. After his brother was killed in prison by operatives of the Maggia, Big Ben Donovan's sanity broke where he vowed vengeance on those responsible starting with Assistant District Attorney William Carver's brother Lonnie. During the struggle with William Carver, a sniper tried to shoot them at Lonnie Carver's funeral only to end up orchestrating the event that turned Bill Carver into Thunderbolt. Then Big Ben Donovan hijacked a Maggia shipment that was under the supervision of Caesar Cicero. When Big Ben Donovan turned to Luke Cage for help, they defeated Caesar Cicero's men before being defeated by Man Mountain Marko who brought them to Caesar Cicero. Before Caesar Cicero's men could bury Luke Cage alive, Iron Fist and Thunderbolt arrived to help Luke Cage and Big Ben Donovan. Upon Thunderbolt realizing that Big Ben Donovan had Lonnie Carver killed, Thunderbolt removed his mask and advanced towards Big Ben Donovan as Luke Cage emerged from the ground to intervene. Before Thunderbolt died of his powers' side effects that aged him to an old man, he was happy that he now knows who killed his brother.

Big Ben Donovan later came under the employ of Tombstone at the time when Tombstone was working for the Serbian Black Maria Gang. When the "Marvel Knights" investigated the criminal activity, Tombstone sent Bengal, Big Ben Donovan, and Bullet to deal with them. Big Ben Donovan faced off against Daredevil where Black Widow's "widow bites" managed to take down Big Ben Donovan.

Big Ben Donovan was incarcerated in the Cage where he gained weight. Upon Tombstone being incarcerated at the Cage, he enlisted Big Ben Donovan, Hypno-Hustler, and a second Rocket Racer to help him against Kangaroo. When the three villains held Kangaroo down so that Tombstone could kill him, the prison guards intervened. Kangaroo beat back his attackers which landed Big Ben Donovan, Hypno-Hustler, and Rocket Racer II in the prison infirmary.

It was revealed that Big Ben Donovan has a son named Little Ben Donovan who Big Ben Donovan left as a kid. He did managed to put money into his son's trust fund so that he can go to Columbia University after high school. During that time, Eric Slaughter took over the criminal organization at the docks where he had his minion Floyd kill a dock worker. Agent Purcell of a rogue task force had found Big Ben Donovan in his prison and forced him to take the rap for the dock worker's murder and be sentenced to death or else they will harm Little Ben Donovan.

Five days from his execution, Big Ben Donovan was visited by Dakota North where she recorded his confession and his conversion to Islam. He later got a visit from Matt Murdock who wanted to be his lawyer. Matt Murdock expressed his interest in helping Big Ben Donovan getting cleared of all charges. Though Big Ben Donovan denied that he was innocent and later tried strangling himself in his cell. Matt Murdock later visited Big Ben Donovan in the prison's hospital where he told Matt Murdock to back off. Upon bringing Little Ben Donovan with him, Matt Murdock visited Big Ben Donovan and told him that Floyd confessed to his crimes.

During the "Shadowland" storyline, Big Ben Donovan met Deadly Nightshade at Ryker's Island when it comes to dealing with the members of the Flashmob (consisting of Chemistro, Cheshire Cat, Comanche, Dontrell "Cockroach" Hamilton, Mr. Fish, and Spear). While Dontrell Hamilton, Mr. Fish, and Spear were released, Big Ben Donovan was unable to secure the release of Chemistro, Cheshire Cat, and Comanche due to their warrants and/or parole violations.

Powers and abilities
Big Ben Donovan has super-strength.

Equipment
Back in his early days, he sported really big platform shoes where the tips and the heels are made of steel that enable him to do powerful kicking attacks.

In other media
 Big Ben Donovan appears in The Avengers: Earth's Mightiest Heroes episode "To Steal an Ant-Man" as a member of William Cross' gang.
 Benjamin Donovan appears in Marvel's Netflix television series, portrayed by Danny Johnson as an adult and Chaundre Hall-Broomfield as a child. This version is a crooked defense attorney at the law firm Donovan and Partners who represents high-profile criminals and corrupt politicians in New York City's criminal underworld.
 First appearing in the second season of Daredevil, Donovan represents Wilson Fisk as his attorney, consigliere, and financial advisor. In the third season, Donovan successfully arranges for Fisk's release from prison by brokering a deal with the FBI to have the latter serve as an informant in exchange for Vanessa Marianna's safety.
 Donovan also appears in Luke Cage, managing Mariah Dillard's affairs and representing Cornell "Cottonmouth" Stokes in court until Cottonmouth is killed by Dillard and Donovan represents Candace Miller, a hostess at the Harlem's Paradise nightclub who Dillard hired to help frame Luke Cage for Cottonmouth's murder. Later in the series, Donovan temporarily defects to Bushmaster after the latter forces Raymond "Piranha" Jones to deplete Dillard's bank accounts until he discovers Bushmaster's act was not legally binding. Additionally, it is revealed that Donovan has been the Stokes family's lawyer for over 25 years, with his law school tuition being paid for by Dillard and Cottonmouth's grandmother, Maybelline "Mama Mabel" Stokes.

References

External links
 Big Ben Donovan at Marvel Wiki
 Big Ben Donovan at Comic Vine
 Big Ben Donovan at Marvel Appendix

Comics characters introduced in 1973
Marvel Comics male characters
Fictional lawyers
Luke Cage
Characters created by Steve Englehart
Marvel Comics characters with superhuman strength